Mordellistena postcoxalis is a species of beetle in the genus Mordellistena of the family Mordellidae. It was described by Lea in 1931.

References

Beetles described in 1931
postcoxalis